

history 
The Minneapolis–Saint Paul International Film Festival (MSPIFF) is a springtime film festival in the U.S. state of Minnesota that has been held since 1981.  It began as the Rivertown Film Festival of Pine City and eventually grew to become the largest film event in the Upper Midwest, with an annual attendance that exceeds 40,000.

Historically lauded for being one of the world's finest showcases of Scandinavian films, the festival features an eclectic lineup of films from more than 70 countries annually. Locally produced material is also highlighted through a series called Minnesota Made, or MN Made.

organisation 
The Festival is organized by the Film Society of Minneapolis St. Paul, a 501(c)(3) non-profit film exhibition organization operating out of the St. Anthony Main Theatre on the Mississippi River in downtown Minneapolis.  Several other area theaters also participate in the film festival.

reception 
In December 2014, the Film Society attracted national attention when it became one of the few distributors in the country to exhibit the controversial film The Interview after Sony Pictures reinstated the film's theatrical release after scrapping it amidst threats from hackers purportedly associated with the North Korean government.

awards from Film Society at this Festival

Best Of Fest 
 The Long Breakup 41 Minneapolis–Saint Paul International Film Festival, 2022

References

External links
 Minneapolis St. Paul International Film Festival website
 The Film Society of Minneapolis St. Paul website

Film festivals in Minnesota
Culture of Minneapolis
Culture of Saint Paul, Minnesota
Tourist attractions in Minneapolis